Lakshman Ganga or Bhyundar Ganga is a minor river that flows through the Bhuyandar Valley, from Hemkund Lake.
It merges with Pushpawati River in Ghangaria.

It then forms a Tributary to Alaknanda in Govindghat.

See also
Valley of Flowers

References

Rivers of Uttarakhand
Rivers of India